Ancylonotini is a tribe of longhorn beetles of the subfamily Lamiinae. It was described by Lacordaire in 1869.

Taxonomy
 Agranolamia Baguena, 1952
 Ancylonotopsis Breuning, 1938
 Ancylonotus Dejean, 1835
 Apalimnodes Franz, 1966
 Cnemolia Jordan, 1903
 Cnemolioides Breuning, 1938
 Dorcoeax Breuning, 1945
 Falsidactus Breuning, 1938
 Gigantopalimna Breuning, 1964
 Haploeax Aurivillius, 1907
 Idactus Pascoe, 1864
 Lasiopezus Pascoe, 1895
 Latisternum Jordan, 1894
 Mimocularia Breuning, 1970
 Mimopezus Breuning, 1970
 Oeax Pascoe, 1864
 Palimna Pascoe, 1862
 Palimnodes Breuning, 1938
 Paraderpas Breuning, 1968
 Paralatisternum Breuning, 1963
 Parapezus Breuning, 1938
 Paridactus Gahan, 1898
 Paroeax Jordan, 1903
 Parorsidis Breuning, 1935
 Phloeus Jordan, 1903
 Prosidactus Teocchi et al., 2010
 Pseudidactus Breuning, 1977
 Pseudolatisternum Breuning, 1938
 Pseudoparaphloeus Sama, 2009
 Pseudopezus Breuning, 1969
 Sarathropezus Kolbe, 1893
 Stenophloeus Breuning, 1938
 Trichoeax Breuning, 1938

References

 
Lamiinae